"Look for a Star" is a song written by Mark Anthony composed by Tony Hatch) and performed by Garry Mills for the 1960 UK movie Circus of Horrors. It reached #7 on the UK charts. When the movie was released in the U.S. there were several versions of the song quickly recorded, the main one being by Buzz Cason under the pseudonym, Garry Miles (in order to capitalize on the success of Gary Mills' UK original). Snuff Garrett produced the song and came up with the pseudonym. The strategy worked and the Garry Miles version reached #16 on the U.S. pop chart in 1960.

Other charting versions
Billy Vaughn and His Orchestra released an instrumental version of the song in 1960 which reached #13 on the Cashbox chart and #19 on the U.S. pop chart.
Deane Hawley released a version of the song in 1960 which reached #29 on the U.S. pop chart.
Jericho Brown (Robert Hensley) reached the #6 spot on the U.S. pop chart in 1960.

Other versions
The Brook Brothers released a version of the song on their 1962 EP The Brook Brothers.
Werner Müller and His Orchestra released an instrumental version of the song as a single in 1961, but it did not chart.
Heinz released a version of the song on his 1964 album Tribute to Eddie.
The Marketts released an instrumental version of the song as a single in 1964, but it did not chart.
Tony Hatch & His Orchestra released an instrumental version of the song on their 1998 album Hatchback.

In popular culture
Mills's version that was featured in the 1960 film Circus of Horrors.

References

1960 songs
1960 singles
1961 singles
1964 singles
Songs written by Tony Hatch
Song recordings produced by Snuff Garrett
Liberty Records singles
Dot Records singles
London Records singles
Warner Records singles